John Bloom (February 19, 1944 – January 15, 1999) was an American actor.

Career
Standing at 7' 4" (224 cm) tall, he is most famous for his roles as the Frankenstein Monster in the low-budget horror movie Dracula vs. Frankenstein (he remains the tallest actor to ever portray the character), and the unfortunate recipient in The Incredible 2-Headed Transplant.

He also had a role in The Dark, then he played Milt in  Bachelor Party,  The Hills Have Eyes Part II,  Harry and the Hendersons, and  Star Trek VI: The Undiscovered Country  followed.  He played the blacksmith "Tiny" on the TV series Paradise and Guns of Paradise.

Bloom died from heart failure brought on by his immense height on January 15, 1999, in his home city of Los Angeles.

Filmography

References

External links 
 

1944 births
1999 deaths
American male film actors
Male actors from Los Angeles
20th-century American male actors